Julie Eckersley is an Australian actress, comedian and writer and producer. She has appeared in comedy shows including Let Loose Live, The Wedge and Newstopia, and in the drama City Homicide, and the children's television series Dead Gorgeous. In addition to her acting, she has written for episodes of The Wedge and Let Loose Live and produced the award-winning series Nowhere Boys.

Background and career

Along with Trevor Stuart, she appeared on stage in the Secret Death of Salvador Dali. In March 2004, their performance at Griffin Theatre and Strut & Fret Production House, SBW Stables was reviewed by  Bryce Hallett for the Sydney Morning Herald.
 
In 2008 Eckersley performed in the one woman show Bombshells for the Melbourne Theatre Company. She has performed nationally and internationally for companies including Bell Shakespeare, Riverside London, QTC, MTC, La Boite, Grin and Tonic, B Sharp the Griffin Theatre. Her television appearances include, Carla Cametti PD, City Homicide, Blue Heelers, Little Oberon and Let Loose Live and Rebel Wilson's comedy series, Bogan Pride. She has been awarded a 4MBS award and a Matilda award in 2000 for her performance as Rosalind in Shakespeare's As You Like It and for her performance in The Secret Death of Salvador Dali. She performed in Harvest Rain Theatre's production of Much Ado About Nothing in 1999.

Eckersley is a producer at Matchbox Pictures where she has produced a range of shows in different genres including documentary, comedy, animation and drama. She was the producer for Nowhere Boys, Zuzu & the Supernuffs and The Real Housewives of Melbourne.

Awards and nominations 
Eckersley produced Nowhere Boys, which won the 2015 Kidscreen Award for Best New Tweens/Teens Series.

Eckersley is a three-time nominee by the AACTA Award for Best Film (The Turning), Best Television Comedy Series(The Family Law), and Best Television Drama Series (Glitch) in 2014, 2016, 2017.

Filmography

Recent activity
In Bunghole, she had multiple roles as actress, comedian, producer and writer. Eckersley is currently a producer of the Family Law series.

References

External links

Australian television actresses
Year of birth missing (living people)
Living people